The Tunnel (lit. Tunnel 3D) is a 2014 South Korean horror film directed by Park Gyu-taek.

Plot
A group of friends are invited to the launch party of a luxury resort. A strange man barges in, and scares everyone away by declaring that they will all be killed by a curse. They return to the resort to find the strange man watching them, and accidentally end up killing him. They decide to dispose of the body in a coal mine, but get trapped inside the dark tunnels facing the buried horrors within.

Cast
 Jeong Yu-mi as Eun-joo
 Yeon Woo-jin as Dong-jun
 Song Jae-rim as Ki-cheol
 Jeong Si-yeon as Se-hee
 Lee Si-won as Yoo-kyung
 Son Byong-ho as Mr. Kim
 Lee Jae-hee as Young-min
 Ham Sung-min as Small boy
 Min Do-hee as Girl
 Woohee as Hye-young

References

External links 
 
  
 
 

2014 films
2010s Korean-language films
South Korean 3D films
South Korean horror films
2014 horror films
2014 3D films
2010s South Korean films